Elitsa Kostova (born 10 April 1990) is a former professional Bulgarian tennis player.

On 12 September 2016, she reached her highest WTA singles ranking of No. 130, achieved on 12 September 2016, her best doubles ranking is world No. 154, reached on 26 October 2015. Playing for Bulgaria Fed Cup team, she has a win–loss record of 16–18.

Career
At the $25k tournament in Wellington, New Zealand, held in November 2010, Kostova, ranked 254 in the world, achieved her greatest victory in her career. She defeated world No. 42, Jarmila Groth, in the semifinals in two sets. In the final, she lost to world No. 241, Erika Sema, in three sets.

Kostova won her first match in a WTA Tour main draw by beating Alizé Lim at the 2014 Bucharest Open, after coming through the qualifying competition. At the 2015 Rio Open, she reached her first WTA semifinal in doubles along with Hsu Chieh-yu. They lost to defending champions, Irina-Camelia Begu and María Irigoyen, in straight sets.

In July 2016 came her biggest win when she won the final of the Europe Tennis Center Ladies Open in Budapest against fellow Fed Cup teammate Viktoriya Tomova.

At the 2018 Ladies Championship Gstaad she reached the second round, which she has reached on seven occasions on the WTA level going back to 2014, but lost to Marketa Vondrousova.

She retired in 2021 with her last match played at the Belgrade Ladies Open losing to eventual finalist Arantxa Rus.

Grand Slam performance timeline

Singles

ITF Circuit finals

Singles: 25 (6 titles, 19 runner–ups)

Doubles 21 (7 titles, 14 runner–ups)

Fed Cup participation
Elitsa Kostova debuted for the Bulgaria Fed Cup team in 2008. Since then, she has a 10–12 singles and a 6–6 doubles record (16–18 overall).

Singles (10–12)

Doubles (6–6)

References

External links

 
 
 

1990 births
Living people
People from Haskovo
Bulgarian female tennis players
Sportspeople from Haskovo Province
21st-century Bulgarian women